Sol Zim (born Solomon Zimelman on August 17, 1939) is an American cantor. He lives in Queens, New York.

Sol Zim is known for his classic Jewish songs. He is considered to be one of the most important Jewish cantors. Sol Zim has been featured in The New York Times, Daily News, The Chicago Tribune and newspapers from Brazil, South Africa and the United Kingdom.

Notable works
In 1960, he performed with the Jewish Minister Cantor Association at Madison Square Garden. In the late 1970s, many Jewish rock operas were produced, David Superstar, one of the most important was composed by Sol Zim. It is said that this is the first Jewish rock opera. It was performed one night at the Hollis Hills Jewish Center in 1974. He also was part of a Jewish group that performed in front of the Pope John Paul II, being the first time in history that such a large group of Jewish clergy men officially met with a Pope.

Sol Zim is Professor of Jewish Music in New York at the Academy for Jewish Religion. He has been featured on books about Jewish music like "And You Shall Know Us By The Trail Of Our Vinyl". He has also written books on Jewish music.

In 1992, the Academy for Jewish Religion of New York added a Cantorial Program directed by Kenneth Cohen, which was further developed by Sol Zim and Ram’n Tasat.

Education
Sol Zim graduated at the Jewish Theological Seminary Cantorial Institute, and he was awarded an honorary Doctor of Music. Zim studied with other musicians as Kurt Baum, Julius Rudel, Samuel Weisser, and others.

Family
Sol Zim is the descendant of five generations of cantors. Zim's father, Samuel Zimelman, served as cantor of the Hochschule Synagogue in Łomazy, Poland, and Congregation Shaarey Tphiloh in Portland, Maine. Zim's brother, Paul Zim, has served as cantor for B'nai Jeshurun in Manhattan. Zim's other brother, Sidney Zim, was the rabbi at Flatbush Jewish Center in Brooklyn.

Awards
"Hazzan Max Wohlberg Award" for Composition, from The Cantors Assembly.
"The Yuval Award" for his contribution to Synagogue Music, from The Cantors Assembly.
The Jewish Music Leadership Award, for his advancement of Jewish Music throughout the world, from The Academy for Jewish Religion.
The Amit Humanities Award, in recognition of his achievements in preserving the Jewish Heritage for future generations through his musical work.
Honorary fellow of the Cantors Institute of the Jewish Theological Seminary.

Discography
Shabbat Rock: An Original Friday Evening Rock (1974)
Joy of Shabbos: A Family Singalong (1978)
Chanukah: A Children's Sing Along (1979)
Family Celebration (1986)
Live in Concert (1991)
Passover Seder: A Passover Sing-Along (1997)
The Joy of Israel: Jewish-Israeli Ballads 
The Joy Of Cantorial Prayer (2000) 
Cantor Sol Zim Sings Avinu Shebashamayim: A Prayer for the State of Israel, and Much More (2013).
Jewish Memories of Papa
Greatest Yiddish Memories
The Joy Of Israel: Jewish-Israeli Ballads
America's Best Loved Jewish Singer Sings
Sings Jewish Memories

References

External links
 

Jewish American musicians
1939 births
Living people
People from Queens, New York
Singers from New York (state)
21st-century American Jews